Jock Stein Friendship Cup is an exhibition football match held in Cliftonhill Stadium, Coatbridge, Scotland.

This competition was started to recognise the contribution of Jock Stein to both contestants, Albion Rovers and Celtic Stein began his senior footballing career with Albion Rovers in 1942, and in the 1950s played for several years with Celtic, captaining the side to a league & cup double in 1954. He is of course most famous for his managerial career later on at Celtic.

While the principal aim of the Jock Stein Friendship Cup is to honour Stein's memory, the annual challenge match is also one of several initiatives aimed at raising awareness of Albion Rovers in the club's home town of Coatbridge. The club and the Albion Rovers Supporters Trust have engaged with Coatbridge youths and families in various ways; notably through summer coaching sessions and a Christmas Party for local children, and the promotion of awareness-raising initiatives such as the Kick-Out Bigotry campaign.

Celtic usually play its XI team, often composed mainly of reserves or U19 players, and have won each of the nine challenge matches held to date, although two finals were drawn at full-time and went to penalty kicks.

Winners

References 

Scottish football friendly trophies
Football cup competitions in Scotland

Football in North Lanarkshire
Albion Rovers F.C.
Celtic F.C.